Elections to the United States House of Representatives were held in Pennsylvania on October 13, 1812, for the 13th Congress.

Background
In the previous election, 17 Democratic-Republicans and 1 Federalist had been elected to represent Pennsylvania.

Congressional districts
Pennsylvania was divided at this time into 15 districts, 9 of which were single-member districts, five of which had two members, and one of which had four members.  Following the 1810 Census, Pennsylvania underwent redistricting.  Most of the new districts had little correspondence to the former districts, for example, the old 3rd district was divided between the new 2nd, 3rd, and 7th districts.  The 1st, 9th and 10th districts were unaltered, except for renumbering of the old 9th and 10th to 13th and 12th respectively, and the addition of a 4th seat to the 1st district.
The  (4 seats) consisted of Delaware and Philadelphia Counties (including the City of Philadelphia)
The  (2 seats) consisted of Chester and Montgomery Counties
The  (2 seats) consisted of Dauphin and Lancaster County, Pennsylvania
The  consisted of York County
The  (2 seats) consisted of Adams, Cumberland and Franklin Counties
The  (2 seats) consisted of Bucks, Lehigh, Northampton, and Wayne Counties
The  consisted of Berks and Schuylkill Counties
The  consisted of Bedford, Cambria, and Franklin Counties
The  consisted of Centre, Clearfield, Huntingdon, McKean, and Mifflin Counties
The  (2 seats) consisted of Bradford, Luzerne, Lycoming, Northumberland, Potter, Susquehanna, and Tioga Counties
The  consisted of Armstrong, Indiana, Jefferson, and Westmoreland Counties
The  consisted of Washington County
The  consisted of Fayette and Greene Counties
The  consisted of Allegheny and Butler Counties
The  consisted of Beaver, Crawford, Erie, Mercer, Venango and Warren Counties

Election results
Sixteen incumbents (all Democratic-Republicans) ran for re-election, of whom 14 were re-elected. The two incumbents who lost re-election lost to members of the same party, while six of the seven open seats were won by Democratic-Republicans, a net increase of 5 seats for the Democratic-Republicans and no change for the Federalists.

Special elections

Special elections for the first session
Three of the re-elected Representatives did not serve in the 13th Congress, two of whom did not finish their term in the 12th Congress either. Smilie was replaced by Isaac Griffin in a special election held February 16, 1813. The only record of that election is a manuscript which indicates he won by a 779-vote majority, but does not record the name(s) of his opponent(s) nor the total number of votes cast. Robert Whitehill (DR) of the  died April 8, 1813. The election in the 5th district was held May 11, 1813, and in the 15th on May 4, 1813

Neither seat changed political parties, and both took their seats at the beginning of the 1st session of the 13th Congress, which lasted May 24 - August 2, 1813

Special elections for the 2nd session
They were replaced in special elections held on October 12, 1813

Both took their seats December 6, 1813, at the start of the 2nd session.  With Crouch's victory in the 3rd district, the sole Federalist-held seat in Pennsylvania changed to Democratic-Republican control, thus Pennsylvania's delegation was completely Democratic-Republican during the 2nd session, which lasted December 6, 1813 - April 18, 1814

Special elections for the third session
Jonathan Roberts (DR) of the  resigned February 24, 1814, upon being elected to the Senate and James Whitehill (DR) of the  resigned September 1, 1814.  Both were replaced in a special election held October 11, 1814, the same day as the 1814 congressional elections.

Both seats changed from Democratic-Republican to Federalist control, so that for the 3rd session, Pennsylvania's delegation was 21 Democratic-Republicans and 2 Federalists.

References
Electoral data and information on districts are from the Wilkes University Elections Statistics Project

1812
Pennsylvania
United States House of Representatives